Ahmed Shah (born October 20, 1983) is a left-handed batsman and a Slow left-arm orthodox bowler who plays for Afghanistan.

He is a part of the rapidly rising Afghan cricket team that in under a year has won the World Cricket League Division Five, Division Four and Division Three, thus promoting them to Division Two and allowing them to partake in the 2009 ICC World Cup Qualifier where they gained ODI status.

Shah made his ODI debut against the Netherlands at the VRA Cricket Ground on 30 August 2009. Shah also made his first class debut in Afghanistan's debut match in the Intercontinental Cup against a Zimbabwe XI at Mutare on 16 August 2009.

References

Cricinfo page on Ahmed Shah
Ahmed Shah on CricketArchive
Times newspaper report on Afghan team

1983 births
Living people
Afghan cricketers
Afghanistan One Day International cricketers